Thiollierea pachyphylla is a species of flowering plant in the family Rubiaceae. It is endemic to New Caledonia.

References

pachyphylla
Endemic flora of New Caledonia
Conservation dependent plants
Taxonomy articles created by Polbot